Midwestern Gas Transmission is a natural gas pipeline which takes natural gas from the Chicago area and brings it down into the Ohio River Valley, although it has occasionally flowed in the opposite direction.  It is owned by ONEOK Partners.  Its FERC code is 5.

External links
 Pipeline Electronic Bulletin Board

Natural gas pipelines in the United States
Natural gas pipelines in Illinois